Rhinog Fach is a mountain in Snowdonia, North Wales and forms part of the Rhinogydd. Technically, Rhinog Fach is a subsidiary summit of Y Llethr, but is a Marilyn. To the north lies its higher cousin Rhinog Fawr, separated by the shapely pass of Bwlch Drws Ardudwy.

Although shorter than the highest mountain in the Rhinog range, Y Llethr, it is often regarded as the true 'king of the Rhinogydd' due to its spectacular rocky peak. Unlike Fach, Y Llethr's peak is grassy and unremarkable.

References

External links 
 www.geograph.co.uk : photos of Rhinog Fach and surrounding area

Ganllwyd
Llanbedr
Mountains and hills of Gwynedd
Mountains and hills of Snowdonia
Hewitts of Wales
Nuttalls